David Jeffrey Wineland (born February 24, 1944) is an American Nobel-laureate physicist at the National Institute of Standards and Technology (NIST) physics laboratory. His work has included advances in optics, specifically laser-cooling trapped ions and using ions for quantum-computing operations. He was awarded the 2012 Nobel Prize in Physics, jointly with Serge Haroche, for "ground-breaking experimental methods that enable measuring and manipulation of individual quantum systems".

Early life and career
Wineland was born in Wauwatosa, Wisconsin. He lived in Denver until he was three years old, at which time his family moved to Sacramento, California. Wineland graduated from Encina High School in Sacramento in 1961. In Sept. 1961 - Dec. 1963, he studied at University of California, Davis. He received his bachelor's degree in physics from the University of California, Berkeley in 1965 and his master's and doctoral degrees in physics from Harvard University. He completed his PhD in 1970, supervised by Norman Foster Ramsey, Jr. His doctoral dissertation is titled "The Atomic Deuterium Maser". He then performed postdoctoral research in Hans Dehmelt's group at the University of Washington where he investigated electrons in ion traps.  In 1975, he joined the National Bureau of Standards (now called NIST), where he started the ion storage group and is on the physics faculty of the University of Colorado at Boulder. In January 2018, Wineland moved to the Department of Physics University of Oregon  as a Knight Research Professor, while still being engaged with the Ion Storage Group at NIST in a consulting role.

Wineland was the first to laser-cool ions in 1978.  His NIST group uses trapped ions in many experiments on fundamental physics, and quantum state control.  They have demonstrated optical techniques to prepare ground, superposition and entangled states. This work has led to advances in spectroscopy, atomic clocks and quantum information.  In 1995 he created the first single atom quantum logic gate and was the first to quantum teleport information in massive particles in 2004. Wineland implemented the most precise atomic clock using quantum logic on a single aluminum ion in 2005.

Wineland is a fellow of the American Physical Society and the American Optical Society, and was elected to the National Academy of Sciences in 1992. He shared the 2012 Nobel Prize in Physics with French physicist Serge Haroche "for ground-breaking experimental methods that enable measuring and manipulation of individual quantum systems."

Family
Wineland is married to Sedna Quimby-Wineland, and they have two sons.

Sedna Helen Quimby is the daughter of George I. Quimby (1913-2003), an archaeologist and anthropologist, who was Professor of Anthropology at the University of Washington and Director of the Thomas Burke Memorial Washington State Museum, and his wife Helen Ziehm Quimby.

Awards
 1990 Davisson-Germer Prize in Atomic or Surface Physics
 1990 William F. Meggers Award of the  Optical Society of America
 1996 Einstein Prize for Laser Science of the Society of Optical and Quantum Electronics (awarded at Lasers '96)
 1998 Rabi Award from the IEEE Ultrasonics, Ferroelectrics, and Frequency Control Society
 2001 Arthur L. Schawlow Prize in Laser Science
 2003 Samuel Stratton Award
 2007 National Medal of Science in the engineering sciences
 2009 Herbert Walther Award from the OSA
 2010 Benjamin Franklin Medal in Physics, shared with Juan Ignacio Cirac and Peter Zoller
 Frederic Ives Medal
 T. Washington Fellows
 2012 Nobel Prize in Physics, shared with Serge Haroche
 2014 Golden Plate Award of the American Academy of Achievement
 2019 Micius Quantum Prize
 2020 IRI Medal, established by the Industrial Research Institute (IRI).

Appearances
Wineland was a keynote speaker at the 2015 Congress of Future Science and Technology Leaders.

See also
Cat state
Doppler cooling
Resolved sideband cooling
Quantum supremacy
Quantum Zeno effect

References

External links 
 

1944 births
Living people
People from Sacramento, California
Scientists from Milwaukee
21st-century American physicists
Optical physicists
Members of the United States National Academy of Sciences
National Medal of Science laureates
Fellows of Optica (society)
Harvard Graduate School of Arts and Sciences alumni
UC Berkeley College of Letters and Science alumni
Nobel laureates in Physics
Quantum information scientists
University of Washington faculty
National Institute of Standards and Technology people
University of Colorado Boulder faculty
University of Oregon faculty